The 2014 Pertiwi Cup season is the fourth edition of Pertiwi Cup. The season is scheduled to begin in August 2014, but in the end PSSI decided that the competition will begin on 12 September 2014 and ends on 21 September 2014.

Group stage

Group A

Knockout stage

Semi-finals

Third place play-off

Final

Top scorers

References

2010
Indo
Women
Pertiwi Cup